Ross James Draper (born 20 October 1988) is an English footballer who plays as a central midfielder for Elgin City.

Draper has previously played for Shrewsbury Town, Stafford Rangers, Hednesford Town, Macclesfield Town, Inverness Caledonian Thistle, Ross County and Cove Rangers.

Career
Draper started his career as a trainee at Shrewsbury Town, before moving to Conference National club Stafford Rangers in August 2007. He made his debut for Stafford on 10 September, in the 3–0 away defeat in the Conference National to Stevenage Borough. He made a total of 31 appearances during the 2007–08 season.

Draper revealed he worked in a range of jobs while playing part-time, quoting: "When I was at Hednesford I had a job at Birmingham Midshires. I worked with mortgages then in administration before I moved into the collections department."

Macclesfield Town
Draper went on to join Northern Premier League Premier Division club Hednesford Town, before signing for League Two side Macclesfield Town in July 2009. He revealed he had offers from clubs in the Conference National, but wanted to play in the Football League.

He made his debut for Macclesfield on 8 August, in the 0–0 away draw against Northampton Town in League Two. He scored his first goal in the Football League in the 2–2 draw against Morecambe on 22 August. Later that season, on 3 March 2010, Manager Keith Alexander died suddenly at home following the club's away match with Notts County.

Draper signed a two-year contract extension with Macclesfield in April 2010 and at the end of the season, he had made twenty-nine appearances, scoring once. The 2010/11 season, under new manager Gary Simpson – who had previously been Alexander's assistant at Lincoln City and Peterborough United, saw Draper become a first team regular. He made forty appearances and scored five times.

In August 2011, at the start of the 2011–12 season, Draper attracted national news attention after scoring from close to the halfway line against Hereford United. Macclesfield went on to win the League Two match 4–0. Afterwards, Draper conceded that he would never score another goal like it in his career. On 9 October 2011, he scored and provided an assist for George Donnelly during a 2–1 win over Aldershot. Later that month, the club opened contract extension negotiations with Draper. On 25 November 2011, he received a straight red card – for the first time in his Macclesfield career – after a serious foul on Michael Hector in a 2–1 loss against Barnet. After the match, the club appealed his sending off. However, the FA rejected this appeal and confirmed a ban for three matches.
In the early part of the season, Draper had found some goalscoring form but this was halted when he sustained a fractured metatarsal during a 2–1 win over Port Vale. This injury kept him sidelined between December and March.

Meanwhile, the club had slipped into a losing streak, which ultimately led to relegation and ended fifteen consecutive seasons in the Football League. As a result, Macclesfield undertook a severe cost-cutting exercise and released twenty-one players, with Draper being the only incumbent player to be offered a new contract. During the subsequent negotiations, he reportedly attracted interest from other clubs 'wanting his signature'.

Inverness Caledonian Thistle
After rejecting a new contract at Macclesfield Town, Draper signed for Scottish Premier League club Inverness Caledonian Thistle in July 2012, on a one-year contract. His move to Scotland left manager Steve King upset, as it was ruled that there would be no compensation from Inverness.

Draper made his debut in the opening game of the season, a 2–2 draw against St Mirren. Three weeks later, he scored his first goals for his new club, netting twice – in only his second home appearance, during a 4–2 defeat by Celtic. He went on to score in the Highland derby and then notched another against Hibernian. Having established himself in the first team, playing in central midfield, Draper signed a new contract with the club, in conjunction with Billy McKay, who had also agreed to an extension. He later commented that agreeing to the new one-year deal had been an easy decision to make. Another goal later in the campaign meant that Draper finished his first season with Inverness with forty appearances and five goals.

In the 2013–14 season, Draper scored his first goal during the quarter-final of the League Cup. The goal proved to be the winner in the 2–1 win over Dundee United, sending the club into the semi-finals. He received his first red-card as an Inverness player when he was dismissed for a second bookable offence against Ross County on 1 January 2014. Draper helped the club reach the League Cup final after scoring the winning penalty during the shoot-out against Hearts in the semi-final. After the match, he revealed that manager John Hughes had organised mock shoot-outs ahead of the game. He also disclosed that due to his previous occupation as a 'debt collector', his teammates had given him the nickname The Bailiff. In the final of the League Cup, Draper expertly performed his role during the game, by effectively smothering Aberdeen in midfield. However, the match ended scoreless, and after extra-time, Inverness lost on penalties. Despite his team losing, he was named the 'Man-of-the-Match'. Draper grudgingly accepted the award, explaining: "It's nice to get an award like that to show the kids when I'm older but it doesn't mean a great deal at the moment after the way we were beaten. And maybe I didn't deserve it. I'll take it, but it means nothing without a winner's medal to back it up." On 19 March 2014, Draper signed a new two-year contract extension with Caley Thistle. Weeks after signing a new contract, Draper scored his first league goal of the season, in a 2–2 draw against St Mirren on 29 March 2014. Draper went on to make forty-one appearances, scoring twice in all competitions.

At the beginning of the 2014–15 season, Draper's impressive early performances led to him receiving the award of SPFL Player of the Month for August. Soon after, he collected four yellow cards in three matches which resulted in a one-match suspension, however he insisted he wasn't a dirty player. Draper was then sent-off in the 67th minute, in a 1–0 loss against St Johnstone on 20 December 2014 and had to serve a two match ban. He made his first team return, coming on as a substitute for Aaron Doran in the 79th minute, in a 1–0 loss against St Mirren on 4 January 2015. Draper then played 120 minutes, as Inverness beat Celtic 3–2 to reach their first ever Scottish Cup final.> After making the final, Draper said he hoped Inverness could do themselves justice, saying that he would have been happy to have thrown away his League Cup final man of the match award, such was his disappointment that day. Draper played as a centre-midfielder in the Scottish Cup Final, in a 2–1 win over Falkirk as Inverness won the Scottish Cup for the first time. After the match, Draper expressed his delight at winning the trophy following the years he'd spent playing non-league in England. Draper went on to make eighty-eight appearances in all competitions.

Ross County
Draper moved to Ross County in August 2017. Ross County got relegated from the Scottish Premiership that season finishing bottom of the table. The 2018–19 season Draper was part of the team that won the Scottish Championship and Scottish Challenge Cup to get Ross County straight back to the Premiership. Draper was released by County on 27 May 2021 along with nine other players.

Cove Rangers
On 23 June 2021, Draper signed a three-year contract with Scottish League One side Cove Rangers. In September 2021, Draper then joined Scottish League Two side Elgin City on loan until January 2022. On 14 January 2022, the loan was extended for the remainder of the 2021–22 season. Draper, who had been affected by a knee injury, was allowed to leave Cove at the end of the summer 2022 transfer window.

Elgin City
Draper signed for Elgin on a permanent basis on 1 September 2022.

Career statistics

Honours

Club
Inverness Caledonian Thistle
Scottish Cup : 2014–15

Ross County
Scottish Championship: 2018–19
Scottish Challenge Cup: 2018–19

Individual
SPFL Player of the Month: August 2014

References

External links
 

1988 births
Living people
English footballers
Shrewsbury Town F.C. players
Stafford Rangers F.C. players
Hednesford Town F.C. players
Macclesfield Town F.C. players
National League (English football) players
English Football League players
Inverness Caledonian Thistle F.C. players
Cove Rangers F.C. players
Elgin City F.C. players
Footballers from Wolverhampton
Association football midfielders
Scottish Professional Football League players
Ross County F.C. players